David George Dunn (born August 19, 1948) is a Canadian former professional ice hockey player who played in the National Hockey League and the World Hockey Association during the 1970s.

Career
Dunn played college hockey at the University of Saskatchewan and was signed as a free agent by the Vancouver Canucks upon the conclusion of his collegiate career in 1970. He would spend three seasons developing in the Canucks' system, culminating in a stellar 1972–73 season with the Seattle Totems of the WHL, in which he scored 19 goals and 75 points in 63 games and was named the league's top defender.

Dunn finally made his NHL debut in 1973–74, establishing himself as a regular on the Canuck blueline as a rookie. He posted fine totals of 11 goals and 22 assists and 33 points in 68 games, good for 7th on the team in scoring. After a single game for Vancouver at the start of the 1974–75 campaign, Dunn was traded to the Toronto Maple Leafs for Garry Monahan and John Grisdale. He turned in another solid season for Toronto, finishing the year with 3 goals and 14 points in 73 games, along with 153 penalty minutes. In 1975–76, however, he lost his regular spot on the Leaf blueline and was dispatched briefly back to the minors, finishing the season with just 8 assists in 43 games.

With his NHL career at a standstill, Dunn jumped to the rival World Hockey Association for the 1976–77 campaign, signing with the Winnipeg Jets. Playing for a star-studded Jets team featuring the likes of Bobby Hull, Kent Nilsson, Ulf Nilsson and Anders Hedberg, Dunn would experience the most team success of his professional career, helping the Jets to the Avco Cup finals in back-to-back seasons, winning the championship in 1978.

Dunn retired following the Jets' championship win in 1978 and returned to the Vancouver Canucks, accepting an assistant coaching position with Vancouver alongside new coach Harry Neale, a position he held until 1981.

Personal life
He is the uncle of Brett Clark.

Career statistics

Regular season and playoffs

External links

1948 births
Living people
Canadian ice hockey defencemen
Ice hockey people from Saskatchewan
People from Moosomin, Saskatchewan
Saskatchewan Huskies ice hockey players
Seattle Totems (WHL) players
Toronto Maple Leafs players
Undrafted National Hockey League players
Vancouver Canucks coaches
Vancouver Canucks players
Winnipeg Jets (WHA) players
Canadian ice hockey coaches